Undercover AD2025 Kei is a 2000 Japanese video game for the Sega Dreamcast.

Plot
The story starts with a police woman (Kei) and her boyfriend, who is also a police officer, responding to a terrorist call at a hotel. Her husband is blown up by a man named Lon Wei, and the game follows with Kei going on an undercover mission to avenge her dead boyfriend.

Gameplay
The game is a 3D action adventure shooter with auto-aim.

Development

The game was announced in 1999 in a hotel. It is for the Sega Dreamcast.

Reception

Critics largely gave the game negative reviews.

GameSpot.

IGN.

Consoles +

Gameplay RPG

Joypad 

Dreamzone

References

External links
 

2000 video games
Japan-exclusive video games
Dreamcast games
Dreamcast-only games
Third-person shooters
Video games about police officers
Video games developed in Japan
Video games featuring female protagonists
Video games set in 2025